The 1956 Auburn Tigers football team represented Auburn University in the 1956 NCAA University Division football season. It was the Tigers' 65th overall and 24th season as a member of the Southeastern Conference (SEC). The team was led by head coach Ralph "Shug" Jordan, in his sixth year, and played their home games at Cliff Hare Stadium in Auburn and Legion Field in Birmingham, Alabama. They finished with a record of seven wins and three losses (7–3 overall, 4–3 in the SEC).

Schedule

Source: 1956 Auburn football schedule

Roster
QB Jimmy Cook

References

Auburn
Auburn Tigers football seasons
Auburn Tigers football